Ommatoiulus avatar is a species of European millipede in the family Julidae. Individuals are known from Andalusia, southern Spain. Color in alcohol preserved specimens is brownish with yellowish and black marbling on the dorsal surface. O. avatar was described in 2015, with the aid of X-ray microtomography that produced a three-dimensional digital model, becoming the first millipede described from reference to physical type specimens as well as virtual models, known as "cybertypes".

References

External links

Julida
Millipedes of Europe
Animals described in 2015